Lulayyah is a settlement in Sharjah.

References 

Populated places in the Emirate of Sharjah